Pedro Uralde Hernáez (born 2 March 1958) is a Spanish retired footballer who played as a striker.

Club career
Born in Vitoria-Gasteiz, Álava, Uralde started his career with local giants Real Sociedad, already being a first-team regular by the time the Basques conquered two La Liga titles in a row (57 matches and 21 goals from 1980 to 1982). He made his debut in the competition on 3 February 1980 by coming on as a late substitute in a 4–0 home win against Athletic Bilbao, and played there until the end of the 1985–86 season.

Afterwards, Uralde spent one year with Atlético Madrid – 1986–87 – teaming up with another Basque forward, Julio Salinas, for 23 goals, but the capital club could only finished seventh. He then signed for neighbours Athletic Bilbao, going on to appear in 110 competitive games during his spell.

In his final two years, Uralde represented Deportivo de La Coruña, later Super Depor, netting 23 times in the league prior to the arrival of Bebeto and retiring at 34, with 111 top-flight goals to his credit from 338 appearances.

International career
Uralde earned three caps for Spain, his debut coming on 28 April 1982 in a friendly with Switzerland (90 minutes played, in Valencia). Subsequently, he was called for that year's FIFA World Cup, where he featured 23 minutes in the 0–0 second group-stage draw against England at the Santiago Bernabéu Stadium.

References

External links

1958 births
Living people
Spanish footballers
Footballers from Vitoria-Gasteiz
Association football forwards
La Liga players
Segunda División players
Tercera División players
CD Aurrerá de Vitoria footballers
Real Sociedad B footballers
Real Sociedad footballers
Atlético Madrid footballers
Athletic Bilbao footballers
Deportivo de La Coruña players
Spain international footballers
1982 FIFA World Cup players
Basque Country international footballers